
Gmina Zwierzyniec is an urban-rural gmina (administrative district) in Zamość County, Lublin Voivodeship, in eastern Poland.

Villages
Apart from the town of Zwierzyniec, Gmina Zwierzyniec contains the villages and settlements of Bagno, Bór, Guciów, Kosobudy and Obrocz.

Neighbouring gminas
Gmina Zwierzyniec is bordered by the gminas of Adamów, Józefów, Krasnobród, Radecznica, Szczebrzeszyn, Tereszpol and Zamość.

References

Polish official population figures 2006

Zwierzyniec
Zamość County